Samantha Borutta (born 7 August 2000) is a German hammer thrower. She competed in the 2020 Summer Olympics.

References

2000 births
Living people
Sportspeople from Mannheim
Athletes (track and field) at the 2020 Summer Olympics
German female hammer throwers
Olympic athletes of Germany